Graham Faux is an Australian former professional rugby league footballer who played in the 1970s and 1980s. He played for Illawarra, Canterbury-Bankstown and Newtown in the New South Wales Rugby League (NSWRL) competition.

Playing career
After playing lower grades for Canterbury, Faux made his first-grade debut for Newtown in round 6 of the 1977 NSWRFL season against Cronulla at the Sydney Cricket Ground. Faux played a total of five games for Newtown in his only season there as they finished with the Wooden Spoon. 

In 1979, Faux returned to Canterbury and played two seasons in first grade for the club. In 1982, he joined the newly admitted Illawarra side and played 14 games for them in their inaugural season.

References

Illawarra Steelers players
Canterbury-Bankstown Bulldogs players
Newtown Jets players
Australian rugby league players
Rugby league props
Rugby league second-rows
Living people
Year of birth missing (living people)
Place of birth missing (living people)